Little Monsters is a 1989 American comedy film starring Fred Savage and Howie Mandel and directed by Richard Alan Greenberg. It tells the story of a boy who befriends a real-life "monster under the bed" and discovers a secret world of monsters who sneak into children's bedrooms at night to pull pranks on them. Although the film failed critically and financially, receiving a limited theatrical release due to Vestron’s bankruptcy, it obtained a cult following on home video and is considered a requisite title in the gateway horror genre.

Plot 
Brian Stevenson, an 11-year-old boy, and his family has just moved to suburban Boston, and he feels isolated in his new neighborhood. One morning, Brian finds himself blamed and wrongfully punished for several things he did not do. Insisting on his innocence, he blames his 8-year-old younger brother, Eric, who claims to have seen a monster the night before. At school, Brian gets into a fight with bully Ronnie Coleman. That night, upon returning to Eric's room to sleep for a bet, Brian finds the room in shambles, and sees the TV remote supernaturally slide and disappear under the bed. The next morning, Eric and his friend Todd find Brian on the living room couch and joke about Brian being unable to sleep the entire night in Eric's room. Brian bets Eric "double or nothing" to sleep in Eric's room another night. The next night, a determined Brian sets booby traps, and leaves cheese Doritos as bait to attract the alleged "monster."

Brian succeeds in trapping the monster intruder: a blue-skinned humanoid named Maurice. Though initially scared, Brian soon discovers that he and Maurice share the same interests and befriends him. Brian also learns that sunlight causes the monsters to collapse into piles of clothes. Over several nights, Maurice shows him a fun time in the monster world beneath Eric's bed. It consists of every child's dream: all the junk food and video games available, with no adults to supervise. It also has innumerable staircases leading to the spaces beneath children's beds, from which the monsters cause trouble. Maurice and Brian have fun making mischief in other people's homes, and Brian also befriends a girl named Kiersten at his school. However, at the same time, Brian also begins to notice Maurice's ways of causing mischief can go too far sometimes, as evidenced when Maurice eats Kiersten's papers for an important science project she was working on, causing her to get a grade of zero. Brian also becomes disheartened when he believes that his parents may possibly get a divorce.

One night, Maurice brings Brian along with several other monsters to the bedroom of an infant baby, intending to scare it. Finding this to be cruel, Brian opens the bedroom door, exposing the hallway light to the baby's bedroom, but subsequently learns that he is turning into a monster, as his body parts shrink when the light hits him. He escapes the house through the front door and walks through Todd's backyard, where Todd is sleeping in a treehouse. Todd shines a flashlight on Brian, shrinking Brian's arm in the process. The concerned Brian saws off the legs of all the beds in his house.

Due to Maurice's failure to convert Brian (all monsters are former children), Eric is kidnapped by Snik — another, much crueler monster — through the couch bed in the living room. Brian enlists help from Todd and Kiersten. Gathering an assortment of bright lights, they enter the monster universe looking for Eric. "Zapping" various monsters along the way, they march to the master staircase, where Boy, the ruler of the monster world, resides. Boy offers to release Eric and Brian's friends if Brian agrees to convert, but Brian refuses. The bright lights are destroyed and they are all placed with Maurice in a locked dungeon-type room. They manage to escape by turning Maurice into a pile of clothes via an improvised light and slide him through the door crack. They re-arm themselves with more powerful lights, recruit Ronnie, and venture back into the monster world. They return to Boy's domain, and are able to defeat him, while Maurice defeats Snik with a flamethrower.

Unfortunately, Brian and the others find that they cannot return home because the sun has risen. Faced with the prospect of turning into monsters if they do not return to the human world by sunrise, the children travel in the monster world from the Eastern time zone to Malibu where the sun has not risen yet and they manage to escape. Before entering the human world, Brian shares a heartfelt goodbye with Maurice, who gives Brian his leather vest as a memento, promising to meet again with him someday. The kids run to a payphone and Brian calls home to say that he and Eric are in Malibu and begins to explain their story to their parents.

Cast 
 Fred Savage as Brian Stevenson, an 11-year-old boy
 Howie Mandel as Maurice, a monster whom Brian befriends
 Ben Savage as Eric Stevenson, Brian's younger brother
 Daniel Stern as Glen Stevenson, Brian's hot-tempered father
 Margaret Whitton as Holly Stevenson, Brian's mother
 Frank Whaley as Boy, ruler of the monster world
 Rick Ducommun as Snik, Boy's right-hand man
 Amber Barretto as Kiersten, a girl Brian likes
 Devin Ratray as Ronnie Coleman, a bully who bothers Brian
 William Murray Weiss as Todd, Eric's best friend

Brian's father Glen is played by Daniel Stern, who was working on The Wonder Years as the elder, retrospective (voice-over) version of Savage's character, Kevin Arnold. Real-life siblings Fred and Ben Savage play the respective roles of siblings Brian and Eric Stevenson, and their sister Kala played two little monsters.

Production 
Pre-production designs of Maurice and the main little monsters were created by Alan Munro, previously known for his work on Beetlejuice.

Principal photography took place from August to October 1988, in Wilmington, North Carolina. Interiors were filmed at DEG Studios (Now EUE Screen Gems). The monster underworld, the toughest portion of photography, was filmed primarily at the abandoned (and some say notorious) Ideal Cement Plant in Castle Hayne, North Carolina. Many of the stairs and bridges were actually built within the plant; some stairs reaching 20 to 30 feet high. A second unit, also working at the cement plant, created and filmed miniatures for forced-perspective shots with the life-sized sets. Production days at the cement plant totaled 1/3 of the film's principal photography - which went 16 days over schedule due to longer than expected filming at the plant.

Reminiscing about filming at the cement plant, gaffer Jock Brandis told the Wilmington Star-New’s Cape Fear: Unearthed podcast in 2021:

"We used to call it Stage 13. It was bad luck. No one wanted to be out there. The reason we used it was because it was this amazingly flexible place; these huge cavernous spaces made of concrete and steel with walkways and conveyor belts and tunnels and just this fanciful stuff. And you could basically turn it into anything. It was great because the world in Little Monsters was this mythical magical world underground, where it’s eternally night and kids who were smart enough could figure out that there was a portal under their beds. It was a world of eternal fun and games and snacks. We had to do this strange underworld thing, so it was video games and weird walkways, catwalks and tunnels. The beauty of it was that it was an indestructible building, so there’s nothing you could to do damage it. Even if you’re filming inside a stage and you’re doing explosions or you’re doing collapses, you could destroy the inside of a soundstage. There’s no way you could destroy the 3-foot-thick walls of the cement plant."

Other key locations were the Wilmington National Cemetery and Wrightsville Beach.

The film has at least three known and unreleased deleted scenes. According to one of the film's set production assistants, Steve Head, a sequence in which little monsters use a flamethrower to "clean" an underworld dining room was filmed but deleted from the movie. It was a continuation of the dining room scene that ends with Maurice putting a chocolate cake in his jacket; and it introduced the flamethrower that Maurice uses in the third act. "It must have taken us at least half a day to film that one shot," he said. "The local fire department brought one of their trucks out to the cement plant. It was on stand-by in case anything went wrong. We did one shot and it was great. No problem. Gary Bierend was the Special Effects Coordinator. He operated the flamethrower. Will Purcell assisted. I don’t know why they cut it from the film." A monsters’ underworld filing room scene was filmed and deleted. Some of its filming can be seen in the behind-the-scene footage on the Vestron Video Collector's Series Blu-ray. And according to the film's special effects make-up supervisor, Robert Short, another filmed and deleted sequence was an evil toy clown scene. The clown, puppeteered by Short, springs out of the floorboards and threatens Brian, Todd and Kiersten after they enter Boy's room.

Post-production visual effects were created by director Richard Greenberg's company R/Greenberg Associates (now R/GA) in New York.

Soundtrack 
The movie soundtrack featured the Talking Heads song "Road to Nowhere" running over the end credits. Two original songs were written for the movie performed by Billie Hughes.

The music supervisors were Gary Goetzman and Sharon Boyle.

Plans for the release of the soundtrack album failed upon the pending bankruptcy of Vestron Pictures.

In February, 2023, Enjoy The Ride Records released composer David Newman’s complete score on vinyl.

Release 
The film was financed by Vestron Pictures. Along with a few other films, the distribution rights were sold to Metro-Goldwyn-Mayer/United Artists after Vestron's bankruptcy (though Vestron retained some foreign rights). It subsequently saw a limited release, with only 179 movie theaters showing the film at its high point, although it grossed just under US$800,000. A DVD release was made available in the United States and Canada on April 6, 2004. Lionsgate released the film on Blu-ray for the first time as part of their "Vestron Video Collector's Series" line on September 15, 2020.

Reception 
On Rotten Tomatoes the film has an approval rating of 44% based on reviews from 9 critics.

Chris Willman of the Los Angeles Times found Howie Mandel's monster Maurice to be uncannily close to Beetlejuice although this film is for children. He notes that "there's sweetness and whimsicality in its fantasy, but there’s also a fair amount of gross-out humor" and admits that "some of it is actually funny". Willman says the film ultimately turns into a special-effects extravaganza, but seems to have been held back by its limited budget.

Revival Screening 
On October 14, 2022, a 35mm print of Little Monsters screened at the Mahoning Drive-in Theater. An exclusive poster, in addition to fan-created artwork, was available for sale on site. Lunchmeat VHS co-hosted the event.

See also 
 List of American films of 1989

References

External links 
 Little Monsters Review at "The 80s Movie Rewind"
 Little Monsters (1989) at Box Office Mojo
 
 
 
 I Wanna Yell at YouTube
 Magic Of The Night at YouTube
 Road to Nowhere at YouTube 

1980s adventure comedy films
1989 comedy films
1980s fantasy comedy films
1980s monster movies
1989 directorial debut films
1989 films
1989 independent films
American adventure comedy films
American children's comedy films
American children's fantasy films
American fantasy comedy films
American independent films
American monster movies
Davis Entertainment films
Fictional duos
Films produced by John Davis
Films scored by David Newman
Films set in Boston
Films shot in Massachusetts
Films shot in North Carolina
Films with screenplays by Ted Elliott
Films with screenplays by Terry Rossio
United Artists films
Vestron Pictures films
1980s English-language films
1980s American films
Films about children
Films about brothers